Edward Raymond Cast (1925–1994) was a British stage, film and television actor.

Selected filmography
 The Dam Busters (1955) - Crew Member (uncredited)
 Private's Progress (1956) - Intelligence Officer (uncredited)
 The One That Got Away (1957) - Driver - Hucknall (uncredited)
 Tiger Bay (1959) - Det. Con. Thomas
 Deadly Record (1959) - Constable Ryder
 The Professionals (1960) - Clayton
 Linda (1960) - Vicar
 Payroll (1961) - Detective Sergeant Bradden
 It's All Happening (1963) - Hugh
 Dr. Crippen (1963) - Warder Harding
 Seventy Deadly Pills (1964) - Police Constable Weaver
 Doctor Dolittle (1967) - Prison Guard (uncredited)
 The Chairman (1969) - Audio Room Technician
 10 Rillington Place (1971) - Plainclothes Sergeant (uncredited)
 Quest for Love (1971) - Jenkins

References

External links

1925 births
1994 deaths
English male stage actors
English male film actors
English male television actors
20th-century English male actors